The Zenith Passage is an American technical death metal band from Los Angeles, California founded in 2012. They are currently signed to Unique Leader Records. To date they have released one EP, Cosmic Dissonance, and one LP, Solipsist. 

They are closely linked with fellow Los Angeles metal band The Faceless. The Zenith Passage's Justin McKinney joined The Faceless to play guitar in 2015, replacing Wes Hauch, who had played on The Zenith Passage's debut album. Derek "Demon Carcass" Rydquist and Brandon Giffin, who had played on The Faceless's album Planetary Duality, joined The Zenith Passage in 2021.

The band went on tour as part of MetalSucks Devastation of the Nation tour, supporting Cryptopsy and Decrepit Birth.

History
The Zenith Passage started in 2012 as collaboration between friends Justin McKinney and Greg Hampton. After releasing a one track demo in February 2012, the band released their debut EP Cosmic Dissonance on January 29, 2013. The band signed a multi-album deal with Unique Leader Records on June 24, 2013.

On April 15, 2016 the band released their debut LP Solipsist, with guest vocals from Fallujah’s Alex Hofmann and a guitar solo by Wes Hauch (ex-The Faceless). Ex-Fallujah and All Shall Perish guitarist Rob Maramonte had joined the band in 2013. The album sold 1850 units in its first week.

The band’s debut LP, Solipsist, was released April 16, 2016 on Unique Leader Records. For the album, the band produced its first music video, for the song "Deus Deceptor".

Drummer Matthew Paulazzo left the band in 2018 to enter film school.

On August 9, 2021, the band released a music video for their new single "Algorithmic Salvation". They also announced the return of drummer Matthew Paulazzo and the addition of new members Derek Rydquist and Brandon Giffin (both formerly of The Faceless) as new vocalist and bassist, respectively.

On December 7, 2022, the band announced they had signed to Metal Blade Records and were in the studio working on two albums. It was also revealed drummer Matthew Paulazzo was once again no longer in the band.

Band members

Current members
 Justin McKinney – guitars, programming, synthesizers, orchestrations, backing vocals , bass guitar 
 Derek Rydquist – vocals 
 Brandon Giffin – bass guitar 
 Christopher Beattie – guitars

Former members
 Greg Hampton – vocals 
 Josh Slater – drums 
 Rob Maramonte – guitars 
 Luis Martinez – drums 
 Michael Hoskins – bass guitar 
 Matthew Paulazzo – drums

Former live members
 Mike Caputo – drums

Timeline

Discography

Studio albums
Solipsist (2016)

EPs
Cosmic Dissonance (2013)
Cosmic Dissonance (Remastered) (2018)

Demos 
 Demo '12 (2012)

Singles 
 "Algorithmic Salvation" (2021)
 "Synaptic Depravation" (2022)

References

External links
 

Death metal musical groups
Musical groups established in 2012
2012 establishments in California